The districts of the city of Rosario, province of Santa Fe, Argentina are administrative divisions created to decentralise the workings of the municipal government.

Rosario is divided into six districts, most named by location although the eastmost is called Center District as it includes the oldest part of the city historically called Centro (center).

Justification

The Municipality of Rosario justifies the division of the city into districts as a part of an ambitious program to distribute not only administrative tasks and services but also cultural activities. The idea was put in practice for the first time in 1997 with the opening as a Municipal Center of the old mansion called Villa Hortensia in the northern barrio of Alberdi.

Before that time, most of the commercial, administrative and cultural activity in the city took place in a small area of no more than five square kilometres in the so-called microcentro, and especially in the municipal building (Palacio de los Leones), which meant that most people in the city needed to travel relatively long distances into an already crowded downtown to conduct business. This tended to overwhelm the capacity of the personnel and the facilities. The idea of decentralisation tries to break the center-vs.-periphery model of the city and to bring the municipal government closer to the citizens.

Municipal District Centers

The Municipal District Centers (Centros Municipales de Distrito, CMD) are intended for multiple activities. Each has an Administrative Services Area (for general citizen requests, communication with the municipal government, real estate records, etc.), an Urban Development Area, and a Socio-cultural and Health Services Area. They also host delegations of the Municipal Bank, the Civil Register (e.g. for civil marriages), the Provincial Tax Administration, and the provincial-level power company (Empresa Provincial de la Energía), water company (Aguas Santafesinas) and natural gas company (Litoral Gas).

 there are five CMDs at work: the above-mentioned North District Center, Villa Hortensia, the West District CMD Felipe Moré, the Northwest District CMD Olga y Leticia Cossettini, the South District CMD Rosa Ziperovich, and the Center District CMD Antonio Berni.

List of districts

Center District
Population: 261,047 
Area: 20.37 km2 (11.45% of the Municipality) 
Population density: 12,815 inhabitants/km2 
Housing: 110,152 units

North District
Population: 131,495 
Area: 35.02 km2 (19.6% of the Municipality) 
Population density: 3,744 inhabitants/km2 
Housing: 40,492 units

Northwest District
Population: 144,461 
Area: 44.14 km2 (24.7% of the Municipality) 
Population density: 3,273 inhabitants/km2 
Housing: 41,740 units

West District
Population: 106,356 
Area: 40.21 km2 (22.5% of the Municipality) 
Population density: 2,645 inhabitants/km2 
Housing: 31,625 units

Southwest District
Population: 103,446 
Area: 20.19 km2 (11.3% of the Municipality) 
Population density: 5,123 inhabitants/km2 
Housing: 28,284 units

South District
Population: 160,771 
Area: 18.76 km2 (10.5% of the Municipality) 
Population density: 8,569 inhabitants/km2 
Housing: 48,541 units

Sources
 Municipality of Rosario - Decentralisation (in Spanish)

Rosario, Santa Fe
Subdivisions of Argentina